The 2003 San Marino local elections were held on 30 November to elect the mayors and the councils of the nine municipalities of San Marino.  Overall turnout was 55.4%.  The election in Borgo Maggiore was declared invalid, as the turnout quorum was not reached.  Therefore, a second election was held on 18 April 2004.

Electoral system
Voters elected the mayor (Italian: capitano di castello) and the municipal council (giunta di castello). The number of seats was determined by law: the city councils of Chiesanuova, Faetano and Montegiardino were composed of eight members; the councils of Acquaviva, Borgo Maggiore, City of San Marino, Domagnano, Fiorentino and Serravalle were composed of 10 members.

Candidates ran on lists led by a mayoral candidate. Voters elected a list and were allowed to give up to two preferential votes. Seats were allocated with the d'Hondt method if the winner had obtained at least 60% of the votes. Otherwise, six seats would have been allocated to the winning party (five seats if the council had eight members) and the rest of the seats would have been allocated using the d'Hondt method to the rest of the parties. The winning list mayoral candidate was proclaimed mayor.

In the municipalities where only one list contested the election, the election was considered valid if the turnout was over 50% and the votes to the list were over 50% of the valid votes (votes to the list plus blank votes).

Results

Acquaviva

Borgo Maggiore
The election was declared invalid as the turnout quorum was not reached. The elections were repeated on 18 April 2004.

Chiesanuova

City of San Marino

Domagnano

Faetano

Fiorentino

Montegiardino

Serravalle

References

External links
 Election results
 Elections in San Marino

2003
San Marino
Local election
November 2003 events in Europe